Hadad-yith'i (Old Aramaic  ,) was governor of Guzana and Sikani in northern Syria (c. 850 BCE). A client king or vassal of the Assyrian empire, he was the son of Sassu-nuri, who also served as governor before him. Knowledge of Hadad-yith'i's rule comes largely from the statue and its inscription found at the Tell el Fakhariya. Known as the Tell el Fakhariya bilingual inscription, as it is written in both Old Aramaic and Akkadian, its discovery, decipherment and study contributes significantly to cultural and linguistic understandings of the region.

Statue & inscription

The life-size basalt statue of a male standing figure carved in Assyrian style was uncovered by a Syrian farmer in February 1979 at the edge of Tell el Fakhariya on a branch of the Khabur River, opposite Tell Halaf, identified with ancient Guzana. Most stone statues discovered and documented as belonging to the Neo-Assyrian period depict either the kings of Assyria or its gods. The statue of Hadad-yith'i, lacking in royal marks or insignia, is one of only three known stone statues from this period bearing images of figures of lesser rank or reverence.

Based on the stylistic features of the statue, it has been tentatively dated to the mid-9th century BCE, though it could be as old as 11th century when considering the archaic traits of several graphemes used in the Old Aramaic script.

The name of the inscription's commissioner is recorded as Adad It'i (Hadad Yith'i), and dedicates the statue to the temple in Sikanu of the storm god Hadad, a deity worshipped throughout Syria and Mesopotamia at the time.

The statue bears the most extensive bilingual inscription in Akkadian and Aramaic, and is the oldest Aramaic inscription of such length. 
The inscription also contains a curse against those who would efface Hadad Yith'i's name from the Hadad temple, invoking Hadad not to accept the offerings of those who did so.

Name, meaning, root
Hadad Yis'i (Yith'i) is an Aramaic name, and the Akkadian version of the name in the bilingual inscription is transcribed as Adad It'i. That the Aramaic has an "s" in place of the "t" in it'i, becoming yis'i is an indication of how the name was vocalized in Aramaic.

The second part of the king's name is a derivation of an ancient Semitic root meaning "to save", so that the translation of the full name into English is "Hadad is my salvation".

This name is significant in Semitic studies because it establishes beyond a doubt the existence of Aramaic personal names based on and derived from the root yt', meaning "to help", or "to save". Prior to this decipherment, and that of another Aramaic inscription discovered in Qumran, scholars thought that this verbal root ישע, often identified as the root for the names Jesus and Joshua, existed only in Biblical Hebrew, and did not exist in Aramaic. More discoveries and decipherments of ancient Semitic inscriptions have since uncovered dozens of other examples based on this proto-Semitic root morpheme (yṯ'), the earliest of these being from 2048 B.C in the Amorite personal name lašuil.

See also
 Tell el Fakhariya
 Tell el Fakhariya bilingual inscription

References

Bibliography
 
 

 Grayson, Albert K.  (1991). Assyrian civilization. J.Boardman et al., 194-228.

 
 Millard, A., (2014) Context of Scripture Online. Editor in Chief: W. Hallo. BrillOnline, Retrieved 6 December 2014. 
 
 Roobaert, Arlette  (1996) "A Neo-Assyrian Statue From Til Barsib." British Institute for the Study of Iraq 58: 83. Retrieved 27 November 2014.

 

Syrian politicians
Ancient history